The 1988–89 Segunda División season saw 20 teams participate in the second flight Spanish league. CD Castellón, Rayo Vallecano, CD Tenerife and RCD Mallorca were promoted to Primera División. Barcelona Atlètic, UD Alzira, UE Lleida and CFJ Mollerussa were relegated to Segunda División B.

Teams

Final table

Results

Promotion playoff

First Leg

Second Leg

Pichichi Trophy for Top Goalscorers 
Last updated June 21, 2009

Segunda División seasons
2
Spain